Ballard is an unincorporated community in Monroe County, West Virginia, United States. Ballard is located on West Virginia Route 12, north of Peterstown. Ballard has a post office with ZIP code 24918.

The community has the name of Clayton A. Ballard, an early storekeeper.

Ballard is home to Ballard Christian School, which was formed in 1977. The closest high school is James Monroe High, which serves all of Monroe County. The town is also home to a variety of churches and several small business.

The average temperature is approximately 51 °F, lower than the West Virginia average temperature of 53 °F.

References

Unincorporated communities in Monroe County, West Virginia
Unincorporated communities in West Virginia